Rajiv Swarup is the founding president of Shiv Nadar University.

An electrical engineer from the Indian Institute of Technology, Kanpur, he has nearly four decades of experience behind him in incubating, managing and developing both the strategic & operational aspects of large sized businesses, Rajiv recently superannuated from HCL Technologies as Senior Corporate Vice President and Chief Customer Officer – Strategic Accounts based out of Rochester New York.

Swarup graduated from Christ Church Boys Senior Secondary School in Madhya Pradesh, India, 1967.  He received his Bachelor of Technology in Electrical Engineering from the Indian Institute of Technology Kanpur in Kanpur in May 1973 and his MBA from University of Delhi in 2001.

References

External links 
Carnegie Mellon University President Suresh
Suresh Research Group at MIT

Indian electrical engineers
Year of birth missing (living people)
Living people
Academic staff of Shiv Nadar University